Artist Profile is an international quarterly contemporary art magazine published in Sydney, Australia.

History and profile
Founded in 2007, Artist Profile is released four times a year and distributed across Australia, Oceania, North America, Southeast Asia and South Africa. It features exclusive studio interviews and photographic profiles of Australian and international artists, as well as essays by artists, scholars and curators; artist projects; exhibition reviews; and information on books, films, fairs, biennials and contemporary art festivals with a concentration on Australia and the Asia-Pacific region. The magazine is published by nextmedia.

Artist Profile also sponsors and manages artist expeditions, public programs, exhibitions and other arts projects to foster appreciation of the arts, working in tandem with the magazine, to make the creative output of talented artists available to collectors, industry professionals, educators and other artists.

In 2012, Artist Profile was the official media partner to the Melbourne Art Fair as well as a contributing partner to the 18th Biennale of Sydney.

Notable interviewees

 Ai Weiwei
 Bill Viola
 Olafur Eliasson
 Hiroshi Sugimoto
 Enrique Martínez Celaya
 Pieter Hugo
 Adrian Ghenie
 Jitish Kallat
 Patty Chang
 Hernan Bas
 James Gleeson
 Elisabeth Cummings
 Euan Macleod
 Iñigo Manglano-Ovalle
 Louise Hearman
 Brook Andrew
 Rick Amor
 Spencer Finch
 George Gittoes
 Bonita Ely
 Shen Shaomin
 Vivienne Binns
 Del Kathryn Barton
 Sam Leach
 John Olsen (Australian artist)
 Guo Jian

References

External links
 Artist Profile magazine website

2007 establishments in Australia
Contemporary art magazines
Magazines established in 2007
Magazines published in Sydney
Quarterly magazines published in Australia
Arts magazines published in Australia